Robert Hirst may refer to:

 Rob Hirst (born 1955), Australian musician
 Robert Hirst (sailor) (born 1971), British Virgin Islands sailor